The year 1638 in music involved some significant events.

Events 
February 6 – Luminalia, a masque written by Sir William Davenant and designed by Inigo Jones, is staged at the English Court. The work features music by Nicholas Lanier.

Publications 
Antonio Cifra –  for two, three, four, six, and eight voices (Rome: Vincenzo Blanco for Ludovico Grignani), published posthumously
Claudio Monteverdi –  (Eighth book of madrigals for five voices) (Venice: Alessandro Vincenti)

Classical music 
Nicolas Formé – , a double choir motet

Opera 
Benedetto Ferrari and Francesco Manelli – , premiered at Teatro San Cassiano, in Venice
Michelangelo Rossi – , premiered in Ferrara.

Births 
July 15 – Giovanni Buonaventura Viviani, Italian composer and violinist (d. c. 1693)
date unknown – Diogo Dias Melgás, composer (died 1700)

Deaths 
January 21 – Ignazio Donati, composer (born c.1570)
May 27 – Nicolas Formé, French composer (born 1567)
September – John Wilbye, composer (born 1574)
November 6 – Gabriel Díaz Bessón, composer (born 1590)
date unknown – Francis Pilkington, composer, lutenist and singer (born c.1565)
probable – Settimia Caccini, composer and singer (born 1591)

 
17th century in music
Music by year